Christ's Hospital of Abingdon is a charity with a long history, based in Abingdon-on-Thames, Oxfordshire (formerly Berkshire).

History
A royal charter established the Master and Governors of the Hospital of Christ of Abingdon in 1553, the year that Mary I succeeded to the English throne. Sir John Mason, a Tudor diplomat, was its first Master from 1553 to 1566.

The charity supports almshouses in Abingdon. Sampson Strong decorated the hall with portraits of founders, benefactors and former governors.

The charity has been involved with education, educating Abingdon boys from 1608 until 1870. There has been a close connection with Abingdon School since 1870.

Christ's Hospital established Albert Park in northwest Abingdon (west of Abingdon School) in the 1860s on the site of the former Conduit Field.

The current charity is based at St Helen's Wharf in Abingdon, Registered Charity Number 205112.

Names of Masters
The following list contains the names of the Masters.

See also
 List of almshouses in the United Kingdom

References

External links
 Christ's Hospital of Abingdon

1553 establishments in England
Abingdon-on-Thames
Charities based in Oxfordshire
Educational charities based in the United Kingdom
Hospitals established in the 16th century
Organisations based in Oxfordshire
Organizations established in the 1550s
Almshouses in Oxfordshire